The traditional chinese calendar divides a year into 24 solar terms.

Yǔshuǐ / 雨水, Usui, Usu, or Vũ thủy, literally meaning rain water, is the second solar term.

It begins when the Sun reaches the celestial longitude of 330° and ends when it reaches the longitude of 345°. 
It more often refers in particular to the day when the Sun is exactly at the celestial longitude of 330°. 

In the gregorian calendar, it usually begins around 18 February (19 February of / in east Asia time) and ends around 5 March.

Pentads
Each solar term can be divided into three pentads (候), first (初候), second (次候) and last (末候) ones. 

In Yushui each pentad includes :

 in China,
 first pentad /  獺祭魚 : 'otters make offerings of fish'. As fish begin to swim upstream, they are hunted by otters, which are believed to offer the fish to heaven ;
 second pentad / 鴻雁來 : 'the wild geese arrive'. Wild geese begin to make their northward migration, following the onset of spring ;
 last pentad / 草木萌動 : 'trees and grass put forth shoots' ;

 in Japan,
 first pentad / 土脉潤起 ;
 second pentad / 霞始靆 ;
 last pentad / 草木萠動.

Date and time

References

02
Spring (season)